Thuy Thu Le (born August 23, 1966) is a retired Vietnamese-American actress.

Biography
Thuy Thu Le was born in Saigon, South Vietnam. She was raised and educated in the United States, after her parents left Saigon during the Vietnam War. Le was 8 years old at the time. She is a graduate of the University of California, Berkeley. She is bilingual as she speaks fluent Vietnamese and English.

Le is best known for her only role in the 1989 Brian De Palma film Casualties of War, starring Michael J. Fox and Sean Penn. She played a South Vietnamese peasant girl named Tran Thi Oahn (based on actual victim Phan Thi Mao), who lived in a remote village in South Vietnam. She was kidnapped, raped and murdered by a group of American soldiers. Le played a dual role in the film, with a short portrayal as an Asian student whom Private First Class Max Eriksson (Fox) meets years later aboard a transit line in San Francisco, California.

Despite her critically acclaimed performance in Casualties of War, Le chose to retire from acting.  she was working as a schoolteacher in California. She is married and has three children.

External links

1966 births
Living people
Actresses of Vietnamese descent
American child actresses
People from Ho Chi Minh City
University of California, Berkeley alumni
Vietnamese emigrants to the United States